Goosefeld is a municipality in the district of Rendsburg-Eckernförde, in Schleswig-Holstein, Germany.

Goosefeld is south of the municipality of Windeby, but north of Groß Wittensee, Haby and Holtsee.

References

Municipalities in Schleswig-Holstein
Rendsburg-Eckernförde